Cyrielle Duhamel (born 6 January 2000) is a French medley swimmer.

In 2017, after a bronze medal at the European Junior Championships on the 400IM, she wins another bronze medal at the Junior World Championships on the 200IM just a month after.

In 2018 she participates to the Youth Olympic Games in Buenos Aires and win a bronze medal on the 200IM.

It is in 2021 that Cyrielle wins the French title on the 200IM and qualifies herself for the Summer Olympics in Tokyo. The French athlete of 21 years old goes to the semi-final and fail for only 25 hundredth to enter the final. Nevertheless, she improved her personal record to 2'10"84 which is the second best time of the 200IM in France after Camille Muffat.

Competition results

International results

National results 
 Championnats de France 2016 in Montpellier :
  400 IM
 Championnats de France en petit bassin 2016 in Angers :
  400IM
 Championnats de France 2017 à Schiltigheim :
  200IM
  400IM
 Championnats de France en petit bassin 2017 in Montpellier :
  400IM
 Championnats de France 2018 in Saint-Raphaël :
  200m Backstroke
  200IM
  400IM
 Championnats de France en petit bassin 2018 in Montpellier :
  200 Butterfly 
  200IM
  400IM
 Championnats de France 2019 in Rennes :
  200IM
  400IM
 Championnats de France en petit bassin 2019 in Angers :
  100m Breaststroke
  200IM
  200m Breastroke
 Championnats de France 2020 in Saint-Raphaël :
  100m Backstroke
  200IM
  100m Breaststroke
 Championnats de France 2021 à Chartres :
  200IM
  200m Backstroke

References

External links

2000 births
Living people
People from Béthune
Swimmers at the 2018 Summer Youth Olympics
Swimmers at the 2020 Summer Olympics
French female medley swimmers
Olympic swimmers of France
21st-century French women
Sportspeople from Pas-de-Calais